is the term for a journey scene in Japanese theatre, which shows the characters dancing or conversing while travelling.

The term , in its generic sense of  michi wo yuku "to go on a road", is used in lyrical descriptions of journeys from the 8th century. It was also a term for the music in bugaku dances of the Heian period, played while a dancer was moving onto the stage. As a technical term in Noh and Kabuki theatre, michiyuki is used from the 16th century.

In Noh, the michiyuki customarily takes the function of a prologue, the characters introducing the play while travelling to the location where the main action will take place.
In Kabuki, by contrast, the michiyuki often takes place in the last act.
The michiyuki is performed by the travelling characters moving about in a steady pace either on the main stage or on the hanamichi (a walkway or "corridor" attached to the main stage).

References
Martina Schönbein, Die Michiyuki-Passagen in den Sewa-Jōruri des Dramatikers Chikamatsu Monzaemon (1653-1724), 1994, .
Henry W. Wells, 'michiyuki', in John Gassner, Edward Quinn (eds.), The Reader's Encyclopedia of World Drama, Courier Dover Publications, 2002, p. 564.

See also
 Tōkaidōchū Hizakurige
 Walk and talk
 Penny dreadfuls

Kabuki
Noh